The Chicago LGBT Hall of Fame (formerly Chicago Gay and Lesbian Hall of Fame) is an institution founded in 1991 to honor persons and entities who have made significant contributions to the quality of life or well-being of the LGBT community in Chicago. It is the first city-sponsored hall of fame dedicated to LGBT people, organizations and community in the United States.

About 
The Chicago Gay and Lesbian Hall of Fame was created in June 1991. The hall of fame is the first "municipal institution of its kind in the United States, and possibly in the world." The first ceremony took place during Pride Week and was held at Chicago City Hall. Mayor Richard M. Daley hosted the ceremony and afterwards, photos of the inductees were displayed in city hall. Clarence Wood, of the Chicago Commission on Human Relations did not want to continue city sponsorship of the hall of fame after its first year. However, the city continued to sponsor the hall of fame after the first year.

It currently has no physical facility but maintains a website, which allows anyone to visit the Hall of Fame at any time. In 2016, the name of the Hall of Fame was changed to the Chicago LGBT Hall of Fame.

Inductees 
Inductees of the Hall of Fame can be any individuals or organizations who have contributed to the LGBTQ community in Chicago. Mayor Richard M. Daley said that the Chicago Gay and Lesbian Hall of Fame "honors individuals and organizations within the LGBT communities who have demonstrated a commitment to diversity and work to enrich and unify our city."

See also
 LGBT culture in Chicago
 List of LGBT people from Chicago
 Legacy Walk
 Center on Halsted
 Boystown

Further reading

References

External links

Halls of fame in Chicago
LGBT studies
LGBT organizations in the United States
LGBT culture in Chicago
LGBT halls of fame
1991 establishments in Illinois
LGBT history in Illinois
History of Chicago